Marian Gorynia (born 7 October 1956, in Dusina [1] ) is a Polish economist, professor, and rector of the University of Economics in Poznań from 2008 year.

Biography 
Bachelor of Arts degree in 1980, at the University of Economics in Poznan (from 27 December 2008 was renamed the University of Economics in Poznań). From the beginning of his career he was inextricably linked with the university, where he passed all levels of promotion. His professional career started in 1983 the year of assistantship at the Institute of International Economic Relations. After his doctorate in 1985 he was promoted to the position of senior assistant, then a year later assumed the position of assistant professor at the same institute. After obtaining a PhD degree in economic sciences in 1998, he was appointed to the position of professor of the University of Economics in Poznan. In 2000 he received the title of professor of economics.

Education 
 1971–1975 – secondary school in Gostyń.
 1975–1980 – studied at the Poznań University of Economics: specialization of international trade organization and economics, Master of Economics
 1980–1983 – doctoral studies at the Poznań University of Economics
 1985 – Doctor of Economics – 18 June 1985
 1995 – upper academic degree, defence of the 'habilitation' thesis presented to be qualified as assistant professor on 7 July 1995
 2000 – professor of economics

Professional positions at the Poznań University of Economics 
 1983 – junior lecturer, Institute of International Economics
 1985 – senior lecturer, Institute of International Economics
 1986 – tutor, Institute of International Economics (later at the Department of International Business)
 1998 – assistant professor of the Poznań University of Economics
 2003 – professor (professor zwyczajny)

Professional experience abroad 
 1987: University of Lyon, France, scientific training, lectures on international trade functioning in Comecon countries, Institut d`Administration des Entreprises, - doctoral programme on corporate strategy in international trade.
 1990: Buckinghamshire College of Higher Education, Great Britain post-graduate programme.
 1991–1992: The Nottingham Trent University, Great Britain visits as a consulting scientist.
 1991: France, University of Toulouse, visit as a consulting scientist.
 1992: Higher School of Labour and Business Studies in Barcelona and Lisbon, visits as a consulting scientist.
 1997: Institut de Gestion des Enterprises in Rennes, France, visit as a consulting scientist.
 1997–1999: Georg August University in Göttingen, Germany, study visits.

Functions at the Poznań University of Economics 
 1996–2006 – member, Council of the Faculty of Management
 since 1999 – member, Senate of the Poznań University of Economics
 1999–2002 – vice-dean, Faculty of Management
 1999–2002 – chairman, Departmental Commission for Nostrification of Diplomas and Scientific Titles Obtained Abroad
 2002–2008 – vice-rector for scientific research and international relations
 2002–2008 – chairman, Computer Centre Board
 2004–2008 – chairman, Scientific Board of Doctoral Seminars in English
 2005–2008 – chairman, Senate Commission on the Academic Statute
 since 2006 – member, Council of the Faculty of International Economy
 2006–2008 – chairman, Department of Strategy and Policy of International Competitiveness
 since 2008 – rector
 since 2008  – president, Council of the Poznań University of Economics Foundation
 since 2008  – president, Council of the "Kadry dla Wielkopolski" Foundation
 since 2009  – president, Academic Council of the Open University of Economics "ERGA OMNES"

Membership of professional bodies 
Counsellor
 Wielkopolska Chamber of Commerce and Industry (1995–1999)
Member
 Committee on Economic Sciences, Polish Academy of Sciences (2003–2006, 2007–2010, 2011–2014)
 Scientific Council of the Institute of Economics, Polish Academy of Sciences (2007–2010, 2011–2014)
 Research Council of the Polish Economic Society (2005– )
 Wielkopolska Committee for Monitoring Regional Development Programmes (2004–2008)
 Academic Council of the Gospodarka Narodowa (National Economy) Journal (2006–2008)
 Editorial Board of Gospodarka Narodowa (2009 – )
 Editorial Board of Ekonomista (2010 – )
 Editorial Review Board of Journal of Transitional Management (2001 – )
 Editorial Board of International Journal of Institutional Governance (2001 – )
 Editorial Board of Studia Ekonomiczne (Economic Studies), a periodical published by the Institute of Economics of the Polish Academy of Sciences (2002 – )
 Editorial Board of Zeszyty Naukowe (Research Bulletin), published by the Polish Economic Society (2002 – )
 Editorial Board of the publishing series 'CASE Reports' (2003 – )
 Academic Board of Problemy Zarządzania (Management Issues), a periodical published by Warsaw Universitys Faculty of Management (2004 – )
 European International Business Academy (1993 – ), (board member since 2007)
 International Management Development Association (1999 – )
 Poznań Society of the Friends of Sciences
 Chapter of the Economic Award of the President of the Republic of Poland (2011 – )
 Academic Council of Internetowy Kwartalnik Antymonopolowy i Regulacyjny (Internet Antitrust and Regulatory Quarterly) (2011 – )
 National Council of Entrepreneurship (2013-)
 Chapter of the Sława Polski, Orły Eksportu and Dobra Firma Awards, bestowed by the Rzeczpospolita daily and the Ministry of the Economy
President
 Academic Council of the Wielkopolska Chamber of Commerce and Industry (2008 – )
 Chapter of the Złoty Hipolit (Golden Hippolytus) Award (2010)

Main rewards and distinctions 
Individual prizes
 1996: 'Teoria i polityka regulacji mezosystemów gospodarczych a transformacja post-socjalistycznej gospodarki polskiej', presented by the Minister of National Education.
 1999: Book 'Zachowania przedsiębiorstw w okresie transformacji. Mikroekonomia przejścia', presented by the Minister of National Education and the Polish Academy of Sciences.
 2008: First grade prized book 'Strategie zagranicznej ekspansji przedsiębiorstw', presented by the Minister of Science and Higher Education.
 2009: Prize from the Polish Economic Society for the book 'Strategie zagranicznej ekspansji przedsiębiorstw'.
 2009, 2012: Second Grade Individual Prizes from the Minister of Science and Higher Education for organizational achievements.
 2010, 2011: First Grade Individual Prizes from the Minister of Science and Higher Education for organizational achievements.
 2013: Prize from the Deputy Prime Minister and Minister of the Economy for outstanding achievements in promoting exports.
 2013: Second-Grade Individual Prize from the Minister of Science and Higher Education for organizational achievements.

Team prizes 
 2001: Book 'Strategie przedsiębiorstw w biznesie międzynarodowym', worked with K. Fonfara, E. Najlepszy and J. Schroeder. Gorynia was the scientific editor.
 2003: Book 'Luka konkurencyjna na poziomie przedsiębiorstwa a przystąpienie Polski do Unii Europejskiej'. 
 2004: Prize from the Committee on Science Organization and Management of the Polish Academy of Sciences for the teamwork 'Luka konkurencyjna na poziomie przedsiębiorstwa a przystąpienie Polski do Unii Europejskiej'.
 2006: Book 'Strategie firm polskich wobec ekspansji inwestorów zagranicznych', worked with M. Bartosik-Purgat, B. Jankowska, R. Owczarzak. Presented by the Minister of Science and Higher Education.
 2012: Book 'Wejście Polski do strefy euro a międzynarodowa konkurencyjność i internacjonalizacja polskich przedsiębiorstw', worked with M. Dzikowska, M. Pietrzykoski and P. Tarka. Gorynia and B. Jankowska were scientific editors.

Decorations, medals, badges, etc. 
 1980: Summa cum laude
 1980: PRIMUS INTER PARES Nicolas Copernicus Golden Badge
 1989: Honorary Badge of the City of Poznań
 2002: Silver Cross of Merit 
 2007: Silver Medal "Labor Omnia Vincit"
 2009: Medal of the 30th Anniversary of the Restitution of the Order of St Stanislaus, Bishop and Martyr for charity work.
 2011: Honorary Hippolytus Statuette]] and the title of Organic Work Leader.
 2012: Commemorative Medal "Ad Perpetuam Rei Memoriam" from the Governor of Wielkopolska Province.

References

Polish economists